Tynron Doon is a multivallate Iron Age hill fort outside the village of Tynron in Dumfries and Galloway, Scotland. It was occupied on and off from the 1st millennium BC until the 16th century, when an L shaped tower house stood there. Tynron Doon lies at the southern end of the Scaur hills.

Description
The original site is thought to be a multivallate hill fort dating to the Iron Age, of much the same plan as the modern (20th C.) remains.

The site is itself a spur hill of Auchengibbert Hill, and reaches  in height. The fort was built in a natural defensive position defended by steep slopes on the north, south and east sides. The western approach was made defensive by the addition of three ditches and two ramparts, with some of the ditches rock-cut.

In the 15th century the hill was the site of one of nine beacons maintained by the Sheriffs of Nithsdale and Annandale.

The tower house is thought to have been demolished between 1700 and 1750, used to build the church in Tynron (Tynron Kirk) and a barmkin wall fortification  enclosing the summit may have been added in around the same period.

A hut circle dating to the 18th/19th C. is thought to have been a shepherd's bothy.

References

Sources

External links

Hill forts in Scotland
History of Dumfries and Galloway
Archaeological sites in Dumfries and Galloway
Scheduled Ancient Monuments in Dumfries and Galloway
Dumfriesshire